John Roy Ewans FRAeS (21 December 1917 – 22 January 2012) was a British aerodynamicist, and the former chief designer of the Manchester-based aircraft company Avro.

Early life
He was born in Torquay. He attended Imperial College London, gaining a First-Class degree in Mechanical Engineering in 1938. He then did a postgraduate diploma in Aeronautical Engineering.

Career

Operation Surgeon
After WWII, he was attached to the Sixth United States Army Group to search for German aeronautical scientists.

Avro
He joined Avro in Manchester (Chadderton) in 1949. In October 1949 he became the Chief Aerodynamicist. In May 1955 he became deputy Chief Designer. In July 1955 he became the Chief Designer, designing the Avro Vulcan B2.

Whilst at Avro, he was responsible for the design of the Avro 748, now known as the Hawker Siddeley HS 748, of which over 400 were built.

In the early 1960s at Avro, he was working on the proposed Avro 761 airliner, a development of the proposed Avro 771 airliner; neither were built.

BAC
He joined BAC in June 1961, staying at Weybridge (former Vickers) in Surrey until 1967.

Personal life
He married Enid Frayn, a mathematician, and they had three sons and a daughter, with seven grandchildren. He became a Fellow of the Royal Aeronautical Society in 1957.

He retired in 1982 and moved to St Mawes in southern Cornwall, on the coast. He enjoyed sailing, owning yachts. In 1999 he had a stroke. His wife died in 2005. He died in 2012 aged 94.

References

External links

 Telegraph obituary in March 2012

1917 births
2012 deaths
Alumni of Imperial College London
Avro Vulcan
British Aircraft Corporation
English aerospace engineers
Fellows of the Royal Aeronautical Society
Engineers from Manchester
People from Torquay
Engineers from Devon